Sicu or SICU may refer to:

 Surgical intensive care unit
 Sicu (river) in Romania
Siku (instrument)

See also 
 Sicus (disambiguation)
 Siku (disambiguation)